Adam Clayton Powell is a 1989 American documentary film directed by Richard Kilberg.

Summary
The film is about the rise and fall of influential African-American politician Adam Clayton Powell Jr. It was later aired as part of the PBS series The American Experience.

Accolades
It was nominated for an Academy Award for Best Documentary Feature.

References

External links

Adam Clayton Powell at Docurama
Excerpt

1989 films
1989 documentary films
American Experience
American documentary films
American black-and-white films
1980s English-language films
Documentary films about the civil rights movement
1980s American films